Bishop Vitaliy Skomarovskyi (pol. Witalij Skomarowski; born 30 December 1963 in Berdychiv, Zhytomyr Oblast, Ukrainian SSR) is a Ukrainian Roman Catholic prelate as the diocesan bishop of Lutsk since 12 April 2014. Previously he served as the titular bishop of Bencenna and auxiliary bishop of Roman Catholic Diocese of Kyiv-Zhytomyr since 7 April 2003 until 12 April 2014 and as an apostolic administrator of the same diocese from 31 May 2016 until 30 April 2017.

Life
Bishop Skomarovskyi was born in the Polish Roman-Catholic family in Zhytomyr Oblast. After graduation of the school education in his native town, he graduated a medical college, made a compulsory service in the Soviet Army and subsequently joined the Major Theological Seminary in Riga, Latvia. He was ordained as priest on May 27, 1990, after completed his philosophical and theological study.

After his returning to Ukraine in 1990, Fr. Skomarovskyi performed such ministries: a parish vicar in Berdychiv (1990–1991), bishop's secretary and parish vicar in Zhytomyr (1991–1992), parish priest in Sumy (1992–1995), diocesan chancellor (1995–1998) and the rector of the St. Sophia Cathedral in Zhytomyr (1998–2000). In 2000 he was appointed as vice-rector and in 2002 – as the rector of the Major Theological Latin Seminary in Vorzel until 2011.

On April 7, 2003, he was appointed by the Pope John Paul II as the auxiliary bishop of the Roman Catholic Diocese of Kyiv-Zhytomyr and titular bishop of Bencenna. On June 7, 2003, he was consecrated as bishop by Cardinal Marian Jaworski and other prelates of the Roman Catholic Church.

References

1963 births
Living people
People from Berdychiv
Ukrainian people of Polish descent
21st-century Roman Catholic bishops in Ukraine
Roman Catholic bishops of Kyiv